Nagaria Sadat railway station (station code: NRS) is a railway station on the Lucknow–Moradabad line located in the town of Mirganj in Bareilly, Uttar Pradesh, India. It is under the administrative control of the Moradabad Division of the Northern Railway zone of the Indian Railways.

Four trains (Two Passenger / Two Express) stop at the station.

References

Moradabad railway division
Railway stations in Bareilly district